Microtettigonia is a genus of bush-crickets or katydids, endemic to Western Australia and known as micro katydids. It is the only genus of the subfamily Microtettigoniinae.

Species
Microtettigonia includes the following species:
Microtettigonia alleni Rentz, 2001
Microtettigonia illcha Rentz, 2001
Microtettigonia kangaroo Rentz, 1979
Microtettigonia kutyeri Rentz, 2001
Microtettigonia tachys Rentz, 1979
Microtettigonia tunte Rentz, 2001
Microtettigonia whippoo Rentz, 2001

References

External Links & Illustrations

Esperance Fauna: Microtettigonia tachys

Tettigoniidae genera
Orthoptera subfamilies
Orthoptera of Australia